is a waterfall located in  Taihaku-ku, Sendai, Miyagi Prefecture, Japan. It is a nationally designated Place of Scenic Beauty. It is one of "Japan’s Top 100 Waterfalls", in a listing published by the Japanese Ministry of the Environment in 1990.

Overview
The falls are located on the upper reaches of the Natori River, within the borders of both the Zaō Quasi-National Park and the Futakuchi Kyokoku Prefectural Park. According to legend, the falls were discovered by the priest Ennin in the early Heian period, when he was founding the temple of Yama-dera in Dewa Province. In 1825, a small Buddhist chapel dedicated to Fudō Myōō was erected near the base of the falls.

See also
 Japan's Top 100 Waterfalls
List of Places of Scenic Beauty of Japan (Miyagi)

References

External links

Sendai Official Tourist Information 

Landforms of Miyagi Prefecture
Places of Scenic Beauty
Sendai
Waterfalls of Japan
Tourist attractions in Miyagi Prefecture